Gipsy-Gordon Wildland Park is a wildland provincial park in northern Alberta, Canada that is  in size. It is located in the northeast portion of the province within the Regional Municipality of Wood Buffalo, encompassing lands south of the Clearwater River and west of the Saskatchewan boundary that surround Gipsy Lake Wildland Provincial Park. The Government of Alberta announced its creation through its approval of the Lower Athabasca Regional Plan in November 2000.

See also
List of Alberta provincial parks
List of Canadian provincial parks
List of National Parks of Canada

References 

Parks in Alberta
Protected areas established in 2000
Regional Municipality of Wood Buffalo
2000 establishments in Alberta